Milton Keynes City Council is the local authority of the City of Milton Keynes in Buckinghamshire, England.  It is a unitary authority, having the powers of a non-metropolitan county and district council combined. It has both borough status and city status. The borough (which has a substantial rural component) is divided into 19 wards, electing 57 councillors.

History

The 'Milton Keynes District' was created on 1 April 1974 under the Local Government Act 1972, by the merger of Bletchley Urban District, Newport Pagnell Urban District and Wolverton Urban District, together with Newport Pagnell Rural District and that part of Winslow Rural District within the designated New Town area. The council was formed under the same act as the Milton Keynes District Council, subsidiary to Buckinghamshire County Council. The council was first elected in 1973, a year before formally coming into its powers and prior to the creation of the District of Milton Keynes on 1 April 1974. In 1974, the council gained borough status, entitling it to be known as Milton Keynes Borough Council and to annually appoint a (ceremonial) Mayor of Milton Keynes.

It was envisaged through the Local Government Act 1972 that Milton Keynes as a non-metropolitan district council would share power with the then Buckinghamshire County Council (now Buckinghamshire Council). This arrangement lasted until 1997 when the district council gained responsibility for services that had previously been provided for Milton Keynes by the county council.  On 1 April 1997, following a recommendation of the Local Government Commission for England, the Borough became a self-governing Unitary Authority, and the council renamed itself Milton Keynes Council.

Since the gaining of city status in August 2022, Milton Keynes Council changed their name to Milton Keynes City Council, and amended their logo to emphasise their newfound status.

Powers and functions
The local council derives its powers and functions from the Local Government Act 1972 and subsequent legislation. For the purposes of local government, Milton Keynes is within a non-metropolitan area of England. In its capacity as a district council it is a billing authority collecting Council Tax and business rates, it processes local planning applications, it is responsible for housing, waste collection and environmental health. In its capacity as a county council it is a local education authority and is responsible for social services, libraries and waste disposal. The council also appoints members to Buckinghamshire Fire and Rescue Authority and the Thames Valley Police and Crime Panel, both of which serve the borough.

Political control

One third of the council is elected each year for three years, followed by one year without election. Since 1996 political control of the council has been held by the following parties:

From May 2014 to May 2021, the Labour Party held office as a minority administration. Since May 2021, the administration is a Labour Party and Liberal Democrat "progressive alliance".

Technology facilitation

In recent years, the Council has promoted the Milton Keynes urban area as a test-bed for experimental urban technologies. One of these projects is the LUTZ Pathfinder pod, an autonomous (self-driving) vehicle built by the Transport Systems Catapult. Trials took place in Milton Keynes in 2016.

Logos

Milton Keynes City Council has two logos:

The first logo was the oak leaf which was used since the 1990s.

The second logo is more colourful than the previous version, and consists of the two letters M and K, representing Milton Keynes. The 'M' is coloured in azure and 'K' is coloured in green: this is the logo that is currently in use, with a recent revision to change the font and text accompanying it to mark Milton Keynes' city status.

Civic Offices 
The headquarters of the Council and the Council chamber is the Civic Offices building at 1 Saxon Gate East in Central Milton Keynes. The building dates from 1979 and was designed by architects Faulkner Brown. The building is sited very close to the moot mound (meeting place) of the Anglo-Saxon Sigelai (or Secklow) Hundred.

References

External links
 
 

Unitary authority councils of England
Local education authorities in England
Local authorities in Buckinghamshire
Leader and cabinet executives
Billing authorities in England
1974 establishments in England
Council